Xinmin Evening News, formerly known as Xinmin Po, is a state-owned newspaper published since September, 1929 in Shanghai, China.

It is now owned by Shanghai United Media Group. Its current editorial mission is the socialist-inspired "promote the policies from the government, spread the knowledge, change the culture, satisfy the life" (「宣傳政策，傳播知識，移風易俗，豐富生活」; Pinyin: xuānchuán zhèngcè, chuánbō zhīshi, yífēng yìsú, fēngfù shēnghuó).

In 1990, Xinmin Evening News personnel were dispatched to the U.S. to found an American edition to counter negative perceptions of the Chinese government following the 1989 Tiananmen Square protests and massacre.

In October 2020, the United States Department of State designated Xinmin Evening News as a foreign mission of the Chinese government.

References

External links
 

Publications established in 1929
Chinese Communist Party newspapers
Newspapers published in Shanghai
Culture in Shanghai
Chinese-language newspapers (Simplified Chinese)

State media
Chinese propaganda organisations